The  Atlanta Falcons season was the franchise's 28th season in the National Football League (NFL). The team finished 6-10 for the second straight season. Following the season, head coach Jerry Glanville would be fired.

Offseason

NFL draft

Personnel

Staff

Roster

Regular season

Schedule

Standings

Transactions
October 12: The Atlanta Falcons trade running back Eric Dickerson and cornerback Bruce Pickens to the Green Bay Packers.

References

External links
 1993 Atlanta Falcons at Pro-Football-Reference.com

Atlanta Falcons
Atlanta Falcons seasons
Atlanta